Group 1 of the 1958 FIFA World Cup took place from 8 to 17 June 1958. The group consisted of Argentina, Czechoslovakia, Northern Ireland, and West Germany.

Standings

 Northern Ireland finished ahead of Czechoslovakia by winning a play-off

Matches
All times listed are local time.

Argentina vs West Germany
Argentina forgot to bring their change strip, and borrowed the yellow shirt of host team IFK Malmö.

Northern Ireland vs Czechoslovakia

West Germany vs Czechoslovakia

Argentina vs Northern Ireland

West Germany vs Northern Ireland

Czechoslovakia vs Argentina

Play-off: Northern Ireland vs Czechoslovakia

References

External links
 1958 FIFA World Cup archive

1958 FIFA World Cup
Argentina at the 1958 FIFA World Cup
West Germany at the 1958 FIFA World Cup
Czechoslovakia at the 1958 FIFA World Cup
Northern Ireland at the 1958 FIFA World Cup